Poroani is a village in the commune of Chirongui on Mayotte.

Populated places in Mayotte